The United Methodist Church in Sweden was a Protestant Christian denomination that existed in Sweden between 1868 and 2012. The church participated in creating the Uniting Church in Sweden. According to a 2009 report, the denomination had 6,436 members

See also
United Methodist Church in Norway

References

Further reading
 Norén, Carol M. "On to Perfection: Nels O. Westergreen and the Swedish Methodist Church'' (2021) online They emigrated to Chicago.

Former website

1868 establishments in Sweden
Methodism
Protestantism in Sweden
Religious organizations disestablished in 2012
Religious organizations established in 1868
Christian denominations in Sweden